Sharon Brown may refer to:

Sharon Brown (Miss USA) (born 1943), Miss USA 1961
Sharon Brown (singer), American singer-songwriter and musician
Sharon Brown (writer) (born 1946), Canadian author
Sharon Brown (actress) (born 1962), American actress of stage, film and television
Sharon Brown, dam (mother) of thoroughbred racehorse Holy Bull
Sharon Brown (politician) (born 1962), member of the Washington Senate